Josef Hoffmann (born 19 November 1978) is a Czech former football player.

Hoffmann played for several Gambrinus liga clubs, most notably for Baník Ostrava. He was a member of the squad of Baník Ostrava in the 2003–04 season, when Baník won the league title.

External links
 Profile at iDNES.cz

Czech footballers
1978 births
Living people
Czech First League players
FC Baník Ostrava players
FK Mladá Boleslav players
FK Viktoria Žižkov players
SK Kladno players
MFK Karviná players
Association football defenders